Brian Delaney may refer to:

 Brian Delaney, drummer for the New York Dolls since 2005
 Brian Manning Delaney (born 1965), philosopher and writer
 Brian T. Delaney, American voice actor